The Brisbane International Film Festival (BIFF) is an annual film festival held in Brisbane, Australia. Organised by the Screen Culture unit at Screen Queensland, the festival has taken place since 1992, with the program including features, documentaries, shorts, experimental efforts, retrospectives, late night thrillers, animation, and children's films. The festival has attracted more than 400,000 visitors across its history. The festival was replaced by the Brisbane Asia Pacific Film Festival from 2014-2016 but has been revived in 2017 while the Brisbane Asia Pacific Film Festival has ceased operations. In 2018, BIFF was held at Queensland Art Gallery | Gallery of Modern Art (QAGOMA), with screenings held across multiple venues.

The festival features events including the opening and closing night celebrations, special screenings, seminars, question and answer sessions, and awards ceremonies. As well as promoting local Australian content, BIFF includes films from around the globe.  

The 27th edition of the festival will be held from 21 to 31 October, 2021. 103 films including opening film  Leah Purcell's The Drover’s Wife: The Legend Of Molly Johnson and closing film Memoria by Apichatpong Weerasethakul will be screened in the festival.

Events 
In addition to the regular program, BIFF has synergies with Cine Sparks and the Queensland New Filmmakers Awards.

Cine Sparks, the Australian Film Festival for Young People was part of BIFF’s expansion in 2005, with a program of films, workshops and seminars for people under the age of 18.  Cine Sparks is popular with school groups, with more than 10,000 students attending the various sessions. In 2011, Cine Sparks took place in October, as a prelude to BIFF.

The Queensland New Filmmakers Awards (QNFA) is the biggest industry sponsored new filmmaker competition in the country, recognising and encouraging the achievements of emerging Queensland filmmakers. The competition is aimed at rewarding the creative talents of Queensland short filmmakers, with 2011 marking its 25th year.

Awards 
BIFFDOCS — In 2011 the festival established BIFFDOCS, Australia's richest prize for documentary filmmakers. The BIFFDOCS competition rewards excellence in documentary production - particularly films that exhibit the ability to surprise, entertain, provoke and disturb. The inaugural BIFFDOCS award went to Arirang, by one of South Koreas most celebrated filmmakers, 'Kim Ki-duk.

Audience Award — Attendees at the festival are asked to vote after each screening, with the results shaping the festival's Audience award.

Jury Awards — The festival has also hosted international juries, who judge three awards: The FIPRESCI Award, the NETPAC Award and the Interfaith Award for Promoting Humanitarian Values.

From 1992 until 2008, the festival acknowledged a contributor to Australian cinema through the Chauvel Award, named in honour of  filmmakers Charles Chauvel and his wife Elsa Chauvel. The last award at this venue was awarded posthumously to Heath Ledger in 2008, before being revived by the Gold Coast Film Festival in 2016, where it is now awarded annually.

See also

List of festivals in Brisbane
List of festivals in Australia

References

External links 

Brisbane Asia Pacific Film Festival

Film festivals in Australia
Festivals in Brisbane
Annual events in Brisbane
Film festivals established in 1992
1992 establishments in Australia